Marc López was the defending champion, but he chose to not participate this year.
Stéphane Robert won in the final 7–6(7–5), 6–4, against Oleksandr Dolgopolov Jr.

Seeds

Draw

Finals

Top half

Bottom half

External links
Main Draw
Qualifying Draw

Morocco Tennis Tour - Tanger - Singles
Morocco Tennis Tour – Tanger
2010 Morocco Tennis Tour